The following is a list of notable events and releases of the year 1911 in Norwegian music.

Events

 October
 30 – Cally Monrad concert with works of Sverre Jordan, in the theatre of Stavanger.

Deaths

 June
 14 – Johan Svendsen, composer, conductor, and violinist (born 1840).

Births

 January
 1 – Arne Hendriksen, operatic tenor (died 1996).

 April
 1 – Anne-Marie Ørbeck, pianist and composer (died 1996).

 September
 17 – Robert Riefling, classical pianist and music teacher (died 1988).

 November
 25 – Egil Storbekken, traditional folk flautist and composer (died 2002).

 December
 7 – Gottfred Pedersen, composer (died 1941).
 17 – Cissi Cleve, operatic singer and composer (died 1993).

See also
 1911 in Norway
 Music of Norway

References

 
Norwegian music
Norwegian
Music
1910s in Norwegian music